Salebius octodentatus is a species of silken fungus beetle in the family Cryptophagidae. It is found on the continent of North America.

References

Further reading

 

Cryptophagidae
Articles created by Qbugbot
Beetles described in 1852